Benxi (30 June 1994 – 24 December 2016), also known as Mǎ Xiǎochén or Utaoki, was a Chinese Hui singer-songwriter.

Biography
Benxi was born in Kuytun, Ili Kazakh Autonomous Prefecture, Xinjiang, China in June 1994.

In 2011, she began to enter the music scene.

On 30 June 2012, her personal music brand "Go! Go!" was established, which was the first exclusively post-90s music brand in China.

On 24 December 2016, she committed suicide by jumping off a building. Some Chinese media reported that Benxi died of depression in Beijing.

References

1994 births
2016 deaths
People from Ili
Mandarin-language singers
Singers from Xinjiang
Hui singers
21st-century Chinese women singers
Suicides by jumping in China
Suicides in the People's Republic of China